Vrutok Hydro Power Plant is a large power plant in North Macedonia that has four turbines with a nominal capacity of 49 MVA each having a total capacity of 162 MW.

References

Hydroelectric power stations in North Macedonia
Dams in North Macedonia
Gostivar Municipality